Tala, Azerbaijan may refer to:
Aşağı Tala, Azerbaijan 
Yuxarı Tala, Azerbaijan